"It Keeps Rainin'" is a song recorded by Fats Domino in 1961 and written by Domino, Dave Bartholomew and Bobby Charles. It was released in the US on Imperial 5753, and in the UK on London HLP-9374, as the B-side of "I Just Cry". The song was covered by Bitty McLean in 1993, becoming a chart success in Europe and New Zealand.

Bitty McLean version

British-Jamaican musician Bitty McLean covered the song as "It Keeps Rainin' (Tears From My Eyes)" and released it on July 19, 1993, from his debut album, Just to Let You Know... (1993). The single peaked at number two in the United Kingdom and was a big hit across Europe, peaking at number one in the Netherlands. It also reached number one in New Zealand for seven weeks and was certified Platinum for sales of over 10,000.

Critical reception
Larry Flick from Billboard wrote, "The British reggae invasion continues. Former UB40 backing vocalist McLean doesn't stray from that group's winning formula on his solo debut. This is easy-listening reggae, complete with a smooth backbeat and an aloof British vocal. File this between UB40 and Maxi-Priest." Troy J. Augusto from Cash Box described it as "lightweight pop-reggae", that "offers little innovation but enough awareness of what makes a good radio song to earn a few spins at urban and hit outlets." Caroline Sullivan from The Guardian viewed it as "imaginative". Pan-European magazine Music & Media commented, "Just like his "bosses" from UB 40 for whom he's backup singer on their current Elvis cover and album, Bitty has dived into rock 'n' roll's rich archives to return with a Fats Domino tune in a new spicy reggae identity." Mark Frith from Smash Hits deemed it "a clever, innovative record that was really catchy and a deserved big hit." Another editor, Tony Cross, said it "will keep you bogling till your bogle drops off."

Music video
The accompanying music video for "It Keeps Rainin' (Tears From My Eyes)" was directed by David Betteridge. It first aired in July 1993.

Track listings

Charts and certifications

Weekly charts

Year-end charts

Certifications

References

1961 singles
1961 songs
1993 debut singles
Bitty McLean songs
Dutch Top 40 number-one singles
Fats Domino songs
Music videos directed by David Betteridge
Number-one singles in New Zealand
Songs written by Bobby Charles
Songs written by Dave Bartholomew
Songs written by Fats Domino